Iglesia may refer to:
 Iglesia Department
 Iglesia ni Cristo
 Iglesia Filipina Independiente
 Iglesia (Metro Madrid), a station on Line 1